The Alexander Woods-Crook-Tredaway House is a historic mansion in Jacksonville, Alabama. It was built circa 1853 for Alexander Woods, who served as the probate judge of Calhoun County from 1844 to 1880. It was purchased by Samuel W. Crook in 1866, and by Louise Tredaway in 1919. Louise Tredaway left the home to her only son, Floyd “Buddy” Tredaway. It is currently owned by his youngest daughter, Joyce Allison Tredaway. It was designed in the Greek Revival architectural style. It has been listed on the National Register of Historic Places since March 15, 1978.

References

Houses on the National Register of Historic Places in Alabama
Greek Revival houses in Alabama
Italianate architecture in Alabama
Houses completed in 1853
Houses in Calhoun County, Alabama